Skinners Run is a  long second-order tributary to Marshyhope Creek in Dorchester County, Maryland.  This is the only stream of this name in the United States.

Course

Watershed
Skinners Run drains  of area, receives about 44.5 in/year of precipitation, and is about 8.34% forested.

See also
List of Maryland rivers

References

Rivers of Maryland
Rivers of Dorchester County, Maryland
Tributaries of the Nanticoke River